Jessica Cooper Lewis (born April 3, 1993) is a Bermudian Paralympic athlete who competes in mainly 400 metres and 800 metres events.  She qualified for the 2020 Summer Paralympics, in Women's 100 m T53.

She has competed in three Parapan American Games in which she has won four medals and two Paralympic Games where she was the first ever Paralympic athlete from Bermuda to compete in the Games when she made her debut appearance in 2012 Summer Paralympics. She competed at the  2015 IPC Athletics World Championships in Doha, winning the bronze medal in the T53 100m.

References

1993 births
Living people
People from Warwick Parish
Athletes (track and field) at the 2012 Summer Paralympics
Athletes (track and field) at the 2016 Summer Paralympics
Paralympic athletes of Bermuda
Medalists at the 2015 Parapan American Games
Medalists at the 2019 Parapan American Games
Medalists at the World Para Athletics Championships
Athletes (track and field) at the 2020 Summer Paralympics